This is a list of people from Monaco.

Romeo Acquarone (1895–1980), tennis player
Olivier Beretta (born 1969), Formula One racing driver
Louis Chiron (1899–1979), Formula One racing driver 
Charles Leclerc (born 1997), Formula One racing driver
Arthur Leclerc (born 2000), racing driver
Laetitia Mikail (born 1980s), lawyer and event planner
Maurice Revelli (born 1964), former professional footballer
Georges Vigarello (born 1941), historian and sociologist

See also
:Category:Monegasque people
List of Monégasque consorts
List of Monegasques by net worth
List of flag bearers for Monaco at the Olympics